Plantago major, the broadleaf plantain, white man's footprint, waybread, or greater plantain, is a species of flowering plant in the plantain family Plantaginaceae. The plant is native to Eurasia.

The young, tender leaves can be eaten raw, and the older, stringier leaves can be boiled in stews and eaten.

Description
Plantago major is a herbaceous, perennial plant with a rosette of leaves  in diameter. There are five to nine conspicuous veins over the length of the leaf.

Plantain is wind-pollinated and propagates primarily by seeds, which are held on the long, narrow spikes which rise well above the foliage. Each plant can produce up to 20,000 seeds, which are very small and oval-shaped, with a bitter taste.

Taxonomy
Broadleaf plantain is not closely related to the fruit also known as plantain, which is a kind of banana.

There are three subspecies:
Plantago major subsp. major.
Plantago major subsp. intermedia (DC.) Arcang.
Plantago major subsp. winteri (Wirtg.) W.Ludw.

Distribution and habitat
The plant is native to most of Europe and northern and central Asia, but has widely naturalised elsewhere in the world.

Plantago major grows in lawns and fields, along roadsides, and in other areas that have been disturbed by humans. It does particularly well in compacted or disturbed soils. It is believed to be one of the first plants to reach North America after European colonisation. Reportedly brought to the Americas by Puritan colonizers, plantain was known among some Native American peoples by the common name "white man's footprint", because it thrived in the disturbed and damaged ecosystems surrounding European settlements. The ability of plantain to survive frequent trampling and colonize compacted soils makes it important for soil rehabilitation. Its roots break up hardpan surfaces, while simultaneously holding together the soil to prevent erosion.

The seeds of plantain are a common contaminant in cereal grain and other crop seeds. As a result, it now has a worldwide distribution.

Uses
The mature plant contains pliable and tough fibres that can be used in survival situations to make small cords, fishing line, sutures, or braiding.

Some cultivars are planted as ornamentals in gardens, including 'Rubrifolia' with purple leaves, and 'Variegata' with variegated leaves.

Edibility
The leaves are edible as a salad green when young and tender, but they quickly become tough and fibrous as they get older. The older leaves can be cooked in stews. The seeds are so small that they are tedious to gather, but they can be ground into a flour substitute or extender.

Herbal medicine
Plantain contains phytochemicals including allantoin, aucubin, ursolic acid, flavonoids, and asperuloside. Plantain extract has been studied for its potential health effects.

Plantain leaves were used commonly in folk medicine for skin poultices on wounds, sores, or insect stings. The root was used for fever and respiratory infections.

Gallery

References

External links

Flora of the Dominican Republic
major
Flora of Europe
Demulcents
Medicinal plants
Plants described in 1753
Taxa named by Carl Linnaeus
Leaf vegetables